Nahuel Estévez Álvarez (born 14 November 1995) is an Argentine professional footballer who plays as a midfielder for Italian  club Parma.

Career
Estévez made his professional career debut in August 2014 for Primera B Metropolitana team Comunicaciones, he played the final thirteen minutes of a 2–0 win over Sportivo Italiano. He featured eight times in his debut season of 2014, before making twenty-five appearances in 2015 which included his first senior goal when he scored the winner in an away game with Deportivo Armenio. In his fourth and final season with Comunicaciones, 2016–17, Estévez scored seven goals in 35 matches as the club lost the promotion play-off final to Deportivo Riestra. In total, Estévez scored nine goals in eighty-eight games for the club.

On 4 September 2017, Estévez joined Argentine Primera División side Estudiantes. Months later, he was loaned out to Sarmiento of Primera B Nacional. His 100th career appearance arrived in March 2018 versus Aldosivi. Estévez returned to Estudiantes ahead of the 2018–19 season, subsequently making his club debut in a loss away to Belgrano on 24 August. Three goals and 39 appearances later, on 21 September 2020, Estévez was loaned to Italian football with newly-promoted Serie A team Spezia. He made his debut on 25 October in a draw with Parma, having replaced Tommaso Pobega early in the second half.

On 25 August 2021, Estévez joined F.C. Crotone on loan until the end of June 2022, with a purchase option, which could become mandatory, in case Crotone got at least one point in the league in the second half of the season. The deal had a total value of 2 million euros.

On 1 July 2022, Estévez moved to Serie B club Parma.

Personal life 
On 17 March 2021, Estevez tested positive for COVID-19.

Career statistics
.

References

1995 births
Living people
Footballers from Buenos Aires
Argentine footballers
Argentine expatriate footballers
Association football midfielders
Primera B Metropolitana players
Argentine Primera División players
Primera Nacional players
Serie A players
Serie B players
Club Comunicaciones footballers
Estudiantes de La Plata footballers
Club Atlético Sarmiento footballers
Spezia Calcio players
F.C. Crotone players
Parma Calcio 1913 players
Expatriate footballers in Italy
Argentine expatriate sportspeople in Italy